Legan may refer to:

Places
 Legan, islet near Kwajalein Atoll
Legan, Ballyloughloe, a townland in Ballyloughloe civil parish, barony of Clonlonan, County Westmeath, Ireland
 Legan, County Longford, Ireland, village

Others
 Legan chess, variant of chess invented in 1913 by L. Legan

People with the surname Legan
 Primož Legan (b. 1983) Slovenian motorcycle speedway rider
 Mark Jordan Legan American television producer, writer and radio personality
 Santino William Legan (2000/2001 – 2019), gunman at Gilroy Garlic Festival shooting in 2019